Kiskatinaw (Cree for "cutbank" or "river with steep banks") is a tributary of the Peace River in northeastern British Columbia, Canada.

Bearhole Lake Provincial Park and Protected Area is established around the headwaters of the river, and One Island Lake Provincial Park is located on the beginning course. The Kiskatinaw Provincial Park is established on the mid course of the river, east of the Alaska Highway, along the old alignment of the highway, at the site of a curved wooden bridge. This bridge was constructed with the Alaska Highway during the Second World War. Its curved design strategically helped  prevent attacks from bombs. Due to its hairpin curve, completion took nine months.

Fishing for walleye pike and rainbow trout is an attraction on the lower course of the river.

The river gives the name to the Kiskatinaw Formation, a siliciclastic formation of Carboniferous (Mississippian) age.

Course
It flows north and east, where it receives the waters of Sunderman Creek, the north, flowing by One Island Lake Provincial Park, after which it  merges with the West Kiskatinaw River. It continues north through the Upper Cutbank, then receives the Brassey Creek. It parallels Highway 52 on the eastern edge of Sunset Prairie, west of Bear Mountain. It is crossed by Highway 97 and then by the Alaska Highway before it turns north-east. It then flows through a canyon until it merges into the Peace River. It flows into the Peace River west of the Alberta/British Columbia border, within the limits of the Peace River Corridor Provincial Park, east of Taylor.

Tributaries
Bearhole Lake
Blackhawk Lake
Sunderman Creek
Borden Creek
Ministik Creek
One Island Lake
West Kiskatinaw River
Oetata Creek
Halfmoon Creek
Brassey Creek
Tremblay Creek
Fox Creek
Livingstone Creek
Sunset Creek
Coal Creek
Mica Creek

See also
List of British Columbia rivers

References

External links

Rivers of British Columbia
Peace River Country
Peace River Regional District
Peace River Land District